The Department for Work and Pensions (DWP) is a United Kingdom government department of His Majesty's Government responsible for welfare, pensions and child maintenance policy. As the UK's biggest public service department it administers the State Pension and a range of working age, disability and ill health benefits to around 20 million claimants and customers. It is the second largest governmental department in terms of employees, and the largest in terms of expenditure (£187bn).

The department has four operational organisations: Jobcentre Plus administers working age benefits such as Jobseeker's Allowance, and decides which claimants receive Employment and Support Allowance; the Pension Service which pays the Basic State Pension and Pension Credit and provides information on related issues; Disability and Carers Service which provides financial support to disabled people and their carers; and the Child Maintenance Group which provides the statutory Child Support Schemes, operating as the Child Support Agency and the Child Maintenance Service. Three non-departmental bodies are accountable to DWP; the Health and Safety Executive, The Pensions Regulator and the Money and Pensions service.

History

The department was created on 8 June 2001 as a merger of the Department of Social Security, Employment Service and the policy groups of the Department for Education and Employment involved in employment policy and international issues.

The department was initially tasked with creating Jobcentre Plus and the Pensions Service from the remains of the Employment Service and the Benefits Agency. The department is therefore responsible for welfare and pension policy. It aims "to help its customers become financially independent and to help reduce child poverty".

In 2019, the department was found by an independent inquiry to have broken its own rules, in a case where a disabled woman killed herself in 2017 after her benefits were stopped when she missed a Work Capability Assessment because she had pneumonia. Previous research published in the Journal of Epidemiology and Community Health by Oxford University and Liverpool University had found that there were an additional 590 suicides between 2010 and 2013 in areas where such assessments were carried out. The researchers said that the DWP had introduced the policy of moving people off benefits without understanding the consequences.

Until 2021, the DWP was still using ICL VME based computer systems, originating from its 1988 Pension Service Computer System, to support state pension payments. The software was migrated to an in-house VME replacement system, in one of the largest computer replacement projects in Europe.

Ministers
The DWP Ministers are:

The Permanent Secretary is Peter Schofield.

Pension Service

With the creation of the department in June 2001, the Pension Service was created, bringing together many different departments and divisions. The Pension Service is a 'dedicated service for current and future pensioners'.

The Pension Service consists of local Pension Centres and centrally-based centres, many of latter are based at the Tyneview Park complex in Newcastle upon Tyne. At Tyneview Park the following centres are found:

 Future Pension Centre (FPC) provides state pension forecasts for people approaching retirement age.
 Newcastle Pension Centre (NPC) originally dealt with the London area, the Home Counties, and part of West Midlands. Now the service is virtual so all pension centres deal with all areas of the country.
 Pension Tracing Service (PTS) helps track old pensions and pension schemes.
 International Pension Centre (IPC) deals with all enquiries regarding the payment of state pension, bereavement benefits, incapacity benefits and other such benefits for those living abroad.

Local Pension Centres deal with localised claims for state pension and retirement related benefits. Pension Centres are found all over the country. Benefits dealt with at local Pension Centres include:

 Pension Credit (replaced a former scheme known as 'Minimum Income Guarantee' in October 2003)
 Winter Fuel Payments
 Cold Weather Payments

Disability and Carers Service
The Disability and Carers Service offers financial support for those who are disabled and their carers, whether in or out of employment. The DCS have offices throughout the country and deal with the following benefits:

 Disability Living Allowance
 Attendance Allowance
 Carer's Allowance
 Vaccine Damage Payment
 Personal Independence Payment

The department has been found to frequently invite disabled people to interviews in buildings which are themselves not accessible to people with disabilities. When the person does not attend the interview they deny the person disability benefits, causing malnutrition and destitution. The DWP systematically underpaid disabled claimants who were transferred from Incapacity Benefit to Employment and Support allowance risking hardship for claimants. A cross party committee of MP's, the Public Accounts Committee accused the DWP of a culture of indifference to claimants.

Since at least 2020 DWP has had a policy of cold-calling vulnerable and disabled people to attempt to pressure them into accept lower benefit claims than they were legally entitled. In July 2021 the DWP agreed to stop after it was threatened with legal action.

Disability Confident scheme
DWP administers the Disability Confident scheme, which supports employers to employ people with disabilities and to maintain the employment of staff who become disabled. The scheme operates as three levels:
Level 1: Disability Confident Committed
Level 2: Disability Confident Employer
Level 3: Disability Confident Leader.

The scheme is intended to encourage employers to “think differently about disability and take action to improve how they recruit, retain and develop disabled people”, but the DWP lost more disability discrimination cases at employment tribunal than any other employer in Britain between 2016 and 2019.

Tell Us Once
The DWP introduced the "Tell Us Once" system in 2011 to enable people to use a single interface to inform the government about a change in their personal circumstances. Using ‘Tell Us Once’, departments and agencies like the pensions service, HM Revenue & Customs, the Passport Office and local authorities are informed about a person's change in circumstances in parallel, removing the need for "repeated, unnecessary form-filling". Local authority departments making use of the service include libraries, housing departments, "Blue Badge" services and adult social care.

In most cases, a Registrar of Births, Marriages and Deaths will notify a person who registers a death about using the service.

DWP transferred to a cloud-based service in 2016 using the government's G-Cloud purchasing process for IT services. The Crown Commercial Service states that "cutting administration costs and reducing the overpayments of benefits – usually because of out-of-date records of people’s personal circumstances – protected the cross-government savings generated by Tell Us Once, estimated at more than £20 million per year. By switching from a physical infrastructure to a cloud solution, DWP has also benefited from cost savings of around 50% on the IT running costs of Tell Us Once".

Former structure

Before 2008, The Pension Service and the Disability and Carers Service were two separate executive agencies; however it was decided in April 2008 to merge them into one entity named The Pension, Disability and Carers Service.

Both former agencies kept their corporate branding and provided services under their separate identities. The decision was made due to the two agencies sharing about half of the same customers; as a single agency, the rationalisation of services would provide a better service for customers.

The status of PDCS as an executive agency (and its existence as a merged entity) was removed on 1 October 2011 with the functions being brought back inside the department; and both The Pension Service and the Disability and Carers Service becoming distinct entities once again. Prior to July 2012 the Child Support Agency was the operating arm of the Child Maintenance and Enforcement Commission (CMEC).

All are now operated wholly from within the department, with the names continuing as brand identifiers.

Public bodies and estate

The department's public bodies include:

 the Health and Safety Executive
 the Pensions Ombudsman
 the Pensions Regulator

The department has corporate buildings in London, Leeds, Blackpool, Glasgow, Aberdeen, Newcastle upon Tyne, Warrington, Manchester and Sheffield. Jobcentre Plus, The Pension Service and the Disability and Carers Service operate through a network of around 1,000 Jobcentres, contact centres and benefit processing centres across the UK.

Budget
The total annual budget of the department in 2011–12 was £151.6 billion, representing approximately 28% of total UK Government spending.  The department spends a far greater share of national wealth than any other department in Britain, by a wide margin. The department spends an average of £348.9 million with suppliers a month.

A report of February 2012 found that billions of pounds payable had not been claimed. In 2009–2010 the Dept stated £1.95 billion job-seekers allowance, £2 billion income support and employment and support allowance, £2.4 billion in council tax, £2.8bn in pension credit and £3.1 billion for housing benefit; in total £12.25 billion had not been claimed.

Research
The department is a major commissioner of external social science research, with the objective of providing the evidence base needed to inform departmental strategy, policy-making and delivery. The department has developed and uses various microsimulation and other models, including the Policy Simulation Model (for appraisal of policy options), Pensim2 (to create projections of pension entitlements up to 2100) and Inform (to produce the department's benefit caseload forecasts). Datasets held include the LLMDB and the Family Resources Survey.

During 2012 the department announced records of the number of people born outside of the United Kingdom ("non-UK nationals") claiming work-related benefits from 2011, using data already collated within the department together with those of HM Revenue and Customs and the UK Border Agency (whose duties are now fulfilled by UK Visas and Immigration).

Devolution

Scotland

Employment, health and safety, and social security policy are reserved matters of the United Kingdom government. The Scotland Act 2016 devolved specific areas of social security to the Scottish Government to administer and reform. The Scottish Parliament passed the Social Security (Scotland) Act 2018 to establish a statutory basis of Social Security in Scotland. This created a principled based legislative agenda for Social Security providing for social security to be a human right in Scotland. Most aspects of social security in Scotland remain reserved to the United Kingdom and those will remain administered by the DWP.

The Act established Social Security Scotland, an executive agency of the Scottish Government.

Northern Ireland
Northern Ireland has parity with Great Britain in three areas:
 social security
 child support
 pensions

Policy in these areas is technically devolved but, in practice, follows policy set by Parliament to provide consistency across the United Kingdom. Employment and health and safety policy are fully devolved.

The department's main counterparts in Northern Ireland are:

 the Department for Social Development (administers welfare policy)
 the Department for Employment and Learning
 the Department of Enterprise, Trade and Investment (oversees the Health and Safety Executive for Northern Ireland)

Controversy
In August 2015, the department admitted using fictional stories from made-up claimants on leaflets advertising the positive impact of benefit sanctions, following a Freedom of Information request from Welfare Weekly, claiming that they were for "illustrative purposes only" and that it was "quite wrong" to pass these off as genuine quotes.

Later that month figures were released which showed that between December 2011 and February 2014, 2,650 people died shortly after their Work Capability Assessment told them that they should be finding work. The DWP had fought hard for the figures not to be released, with chief minister Iain Duncan Smith at one point telling Parliament that they did not exist.

In 2019, a computer systems was introduced but the DWP refused to reveal details.  Claimants and their supporters feared it would add to poverty and hardship.  Frank Field MP stated in early 2020 that claimants, “will be left at the mercy of online systems that, even now, leave all too many people teetering on the brink of destitution.  We’ve already seen, in the gig economy, how workers are managed and sacked, not by people, but by algorithms. Now the welfare state looks set to follow suit, with the ‘social’ human element being stripped away from ‘social security’.

In 2022 the department refused to release data to researchers at Glasgow University investigating if benefit sanctions were linked to suicides. This was despite earlier promises by ministers they were supporting the researchers.

See also
 Benefit fraud
 Pensions Commission
 Office of Manpower Economics
 Pension, Disability and Carers Service
 United Kingdom budget
 Welfare rights

References

External links
 
 DWP YouTube channel

 
Work and Pensions
Social security in the United Kingdom
Pensions in the United Kingdom
United Kingdom
Ministries established in 2001
2001 establishments in the United Kingdom